Fortana (also known as Canina ) is a red Italian wine grape variety grown primarily in the Emilia–Romagna region of northern Italy. A permitted grape variety in several Denominazione di origine controllatas (DOCs), mostly in Emilia, Fortana mostly contributes tartness and acidity in red blends.

Relationship to other grapes
In the Valtellina region of Lombardy, Brugnola was long thought to be a local synonym for Fortana. Even as recently as the 2000 census, plantings of Brugnola in Lombardy were officially counted as part of Fortana's  planted throughout Italy. However, in the early 21st century DNA analysis revealed that Brugnola and Fortana were actually distinct varieties.

Synonyms
Synonyms describing Fortana and its wines include Albanella gentile, Brugnera, Brugnola, Brugnolera, Brungentile, Codigoro, Costa d'Oro, Dallora, Dallora , Dora, Forcella, Forcellina, Fortana nero, Fruttana, Fruttano, Prugnola, Prungentile, Uva Cornetta, Uva d'Aceto, Uva d'Oro, Uva d'Oro Sgaravella, Uva d'Oro Sgravella and Uva Francese .

References

Red wine grape varieties